Coenagrion hastulatum, the northern damselfly or spearhead bluet, is a damselfly in the family Coenagrionidae.

The species is widespread and common in northern Eurasia but is restricted to elevated or bog-like sites towards the west and south. In Britain, it is confined to a few small lochans in Scotland.

The specific part of the scientific name, hastulatum, from the Latin hastula (small spear) is because of the distinctive markings on the second segment of the abdomen that resembles a spear.

References

External links

Damselflies of Europe
Coenagrionidae
Insects described in 1825
Taxa named by Toussaint de Charpentier